Alan Brady (1909-1969) was an Australian professional rugby league footballer who played in the 1920s, 1930s and 1940s. A New South Wales representative three-quarter back, he played in the NSWRFL Premiership for Sydney's the Western Suburbs and Canterbury-Bankstown clubs, with both of whom he won premiership titles.

Playing career
In 1929, his first professional season,  Brady was the New South Wales Rugby Football League premiership's top try-scorer with 11 tries. A year later, Brady was the star of the first rugby league grand final ever played in Australia, scoring 3 tries in the match that gave the Magpies their first premiership success. Four years later, he was a member of the club's second grand final win when they defeated the Roosters 15–12. He scored 71 tries in his time with the Magpies, at the time a club record, later eclipsed by Peter Dimond.

Joining the recently formed Canterbury-Bankstown DRLFC in 1936, Brady captain-coached the club to victory in the 1938 NSWRFL season's premiership final, giving him the rare achievement of playing in the first premiership victory for two different clubs. He was coach of the Canterbury side that lost the 1940 NSWRFL season's premiership final.

Coaching career

References

External links
Bulldogs profile

1909 births
1969 deaths
Australian rugby league coaches
Australian rugby league players
Canterbury-Bankstown Bulldogs coaches
Canterbury-Bankstown Bulldogs players
City New South Wales rugby league team players
New South Wales rugby league team players
Rugby league centres
Rugby league players from Sydney
Rugby league wingers
Western Suburbs Magpies players